Traditional Cambodian musical instruments are the musical instruments used in the traditional and classical music of Cambodia. They comprise a wide range of wind, string, and percussion instruments, used by both the Khmer majority as well as the nation's ethnic minorities.

Woodwind

Flute

Khloy - vertical duct flute made of bamboo, hardwood, or plastic, with buzzing membrane
Khloy ek - smaller in size
Khloy thom - larger in size

Free-reed

Sneng - water buffalo or ox horn with a single free reedphoto
Pey pok - free-reed pipe While similar to a flute, it uses a single reed to create sound.photo
Ploy (also called m'baut) - mouth organ with gourd body and five to seven bamboo pipes; used by Mon-Khmer-speaking upland ethnic minorities
Ken/Khaen - free-reed mouth organ used in northwestern Cambodia
Angkouch (also called kangkuoch) - jaw harp made of bamboo or metal

Quadruple Reed

Sralai - quadruple-reed oboe
Sralai toch - small quadruple-reed oboe
Sralai thom- large quadruple-reed oboe
Pey ar (also spelled beyaw, and also called bey prabauh) - oboe with cylindrical bore

Horns

Saing - conch horn

Other

Slek - tree leaf used as a wind instrument

String

Bowed

Tro - fiddle
Tro Khmer - three-string vertical spike fiddle with coconut shell body; used in classical music
Tro che - high-pitched two-string vertical fiddle, with face covered with snakeskin
Tro sau toch - two-string vertical fiddle with hardwood body; used in classical music
Tro sau thom - two-string vertical fiddle with hardwood body; used in classical music
Tro u (also spelled tro ou) - lower two-string vertical fiddle with a coconut shell body, with face covered with calfskin or snakeskin; used in classical musicphoto

Plucked

Chapei dong veng - plucked fretted lute
Kong ring - bamboo tube zither, can play thet drum's part
Krapeu (also called takhe) - crocodile-shaped fretted floor zither with three strings
Kse diev or  - chest-resonated stick zither)photo
Pin - Cambodian harp, ancient instrument reborn in modern times

Struck

Khim - hammered dulcimer

Percussion

Drums

Sampho (សម្ភោរ)- barrel drum, played with the hands
Skor (also spelled sko) - long skor drum
Skor thom (ស្គរធំ)- pair of large barrel drums, played with sticks
Skor yike (ស្គរយីកេ) - flat skor drum, played with hands and used in Yike dance drama
Thon, Skor daey and skor arak - goblet-shaped drums, played with the handsphoto
Rumana - frame drum, played with the hands

Gong chimes

Kong vong toch (also called kong toch) - small gong circle
Kong vong thom (also called kong thom) - large gong circle
Kong mon (also called kong mon) - small gong chime shaped curved

Xylophone
Roneat- trough-resonated keyboard percussion instrument; generally played with two mallets and used in Khmer classical and theater music
Roneat ek - smaller xylophone
Roneat thung - larger xylophone
Roneat dek - smaller metallophone
Roneat thong larger metallophone; no longer used

Gongs
Kong vong or kong thom - single suspended gong

Clappers
Krap - pair of flat bamboo or hardwood sticks

Cymbals
Ching (ឈិង) - pair of small cymbals used to mark time
Chap  - pair of flat cymbals

Woodblocks
Pan - woodblock
Nay pay - pellow
Sindang - small size woodblocks

Occasions

Traditional Cambodian musical instruments play a significant role in the Cambodian culture. These instruments are typically used during royal events, weddings, and festivals. For weddings and royal events, the musicians playing the instruments would wear traditional Cambodian attire. Just like the Chinese, with regard to playing context, there is no conductor in traditional Cambodian music because musicians generally learned and memorized how to play the instruments aurally. These instruments provide a sense of identity for the Cambodian people.

See also
Music of Cambodia

References

External links

The traditional music and instruments of Cambodia
Rebuilding the musical instruments of the ancient Khmer. 26 February 2016. tuk-tuk.tv
Mysteries of the Khmer harp. 9 April 2016. tuk-tuk.tv